Nangal Kurud is a village of Bains (a clan of jatts). It is in Hoshiarpur District near Mahilpur.

Villages in Hoshiarpur district